Jeremy William Orde Allerton (born 2 February 1944) is an English former first-class cricketer who played for Oxford University Cricket Club. All of his first-class games were for Oxford University. One of these was a Varsity match when Oxford played against Cambridge University Cricket Club.

He is also a squash Blue and former captain of Oxford University Squash Racquets Club. He is an alumnus of Stowe School.

References 

English cricketers
Oxford University cricketers
Living people
1944 births
Oxford and Cambridge Universities cricketers
Alumni of Hertford College, Oxford
People educated at Stowe School